Mohamadou Diarra (born 26 September 1983) is a Senegalese rugby union player. He plays as a wing.

Diarra plays in France, where his first team was ES Viry Chatillon Rugby, from his debut, joining the first category in 2001/02, to 2003/04. He then would play for Section Paloise (2005/06-2008/09), the first season at Top 14, in one game, and the other three at Pro D2, Limoges (2009/10-2010/11) and US Montauban, since 2011/12, at Fédérale 1.

Diarra is an international player for Senegal.

References

External links
Mohamadou Diarra Statistics

1983 births
Living people
Senegalese rugby union players
Rugby union wings
Senegalese expatriate rugby union players
Expatriate rugby union players in France
Senegalese expatriate sportspeople in France